Aojia is an extinct genus of ptychopariid trilobites of the family Lisaniidae. It lived during the Cambrian Period, which lasted from approximately 539 to 485 million years ago.

References

Ptychopariida genera
Cambrian trilobites of Asia
Cambrian genus extinctions